Thomas Gray, C.B. (1832–1890), entered into the British Board of Trade as a boy clerk in 1851, becoming Head of the Maritime Department by 1869, a position he held for over 20 years, becoming deeply interested in everything related to ships and seafaring.

In 1867, as assistant secretary, he wrote a pamphlet entitled "The Rule of the Road" also known as "The Rules in Rhyme", which became famous for its well-known mnemonic verses. e.g.

According to Charles Dickens, Jr., Thomas Gray either owned or at the very least operated a little steam launch going by the name of Midge as a hobby.

A variant of this poem was featured in "The Donkeyman's Widow" by Guy Gilpatric, a Glencannon story which appeared in the Saturday Evening Post, 29 January 1938.

He died at his home in Stockwell on 15 March 1890 and was buried at West Norwood Cemetery.

Memorial trust
The Marine Society awards medals each year to recognise "deeds of professional merit" in relation to any aspect of seafaring.

Bibliography

References

1832 births
1890 deaths
British surveyors
Burials at West Norwood Cemetery